Microcebus jonahi, or Jonah's mouse lemur, is tiny species of primate. It weighs 60 g and has a body length of around 13 cm and its tail measures around 13 cm as well.  It is the 25th recognized species of mouse lemur and the 108th recognized species of lemur.

Description 
Jonah's mouse lemur has small ears and the characteristic huge eyes of lemurs with a distinct white stripe between the eyes. It has short, dense fur with a white with slightly yellowish belly and a brownish back. It weighs 60 g and has a body length of around 13 cm and its tail measures around 13 cm as well.

Distribution
Jonah's mouse lemur lives in northeastern Madagascar, including within the protected Mananara National Park. The species was named after Malagasy primatologist Dr. Jonah Ratsimbazafy.

Conservation status
The forested area in the region where the Jonah's mouse lemur is found is undergoing massive deforestation. Once an uninterrupted stretch of rainforest, it has been whittled down to fragments. The fragmentation is expected to intensify, stranding the mouse lemurs, curtailing their access to food, and narrowing their genetic diversity.

See also
List of primates described in the 2020s

Notes

References 
 Schüßler, D., Blanco, M. B., Salmona, J., Poelstra, J., Andriambeloson, J. B., Miller, A., ... & Radespiel, U. (2020). Ecology and morphology of mouse lemurs (Microcebus spp.) in a hotspot of microendemism in northeastern Madagascar, with the description of a new species. American Journal of Primatology, 82(9), e23180. https://onlinelibrary.wiley.com/doi/full/10.1002/ajp.23180
 Poelstra, J. W., Salmona, J., Tiley, G. P., Schüßler, D., Blanco, M. B., Andriambeloson, J. B., ... & Yoder, A. D. (2021). Cryptic patterns of speciation in cryptic primates: microendemic mouse lemurs and the multispecies coalescent. Systematic Biology, 70(2), 203-218. https://academic.oup.com/sysbio/article/70/2/203/5869053?login=true

Mammals described in 2020
Mouse lemurs